Jerzy Czeszejko-Sochacki (29 November 1892, in Nizhyn – 4 September 1933, in Moscow) was a Polish socialist, later communist politician, publicist and an early victim of Stalinist repression.

He joined the Polish Socialist Party in 1914, and the Communist Party of Poland (KPP) in 1921.  From 1921-33 he was a member and alternate member of the KPP Central Committee, and from 1929-33 sat on its politburo.  A member of the Polish Parliament (Sejm).  KPP representative to the Communist International executive from 1930 and a deputy member of its Presidium from 1931.  He was arrested in Moscow on 15 August 1933.  He committed suicide on 4 September 1933, according to one version by jumping from a bridge over the prison courtyard, and according to another by jumping from the window of the room where he was being interrogated and tortured.  He left a note, written in his own blood, proclaiming his innocence and undying loyalty to the communist party.

Sources. Recommended literature. External links
 William J. Chase,  Enemies within the Gates? The Comintern and the Stalinist Repression, 1934-1939 Yale University Press] 2001, ; Chapter 5. The Victims of Vigilance in the web - Yale Annals of Communism Project
 Marian Kamil Dziewanowski, The Communist Party of Poland. An outline of history. Second edition. Harvard University Press, Cambridge, Mass., and London, England, 1976,
 Gabriele Simoncini, The Communist Party of Poland: 1918-1929. A Study in Political Ideology. Mellen Press. Lewiston, New York; Queenston, Canada; Lampeter, United Kingdom, 1993.  

1892 births
1933 suicides
People from Nizhyn
People from Nezhinsky Uyezd
People from the Russian Empire of Polish descent
Polish Socialist Party politicians
Communist Party of Poland politicians
Members of the Sejm of the Second Polish Republic (1922–1927)
Members of the Sejm of the Second Polish Republic (1928–1930)
Polish expatriates in the Soviet Union
Suicides by jumping in Russia
Polish politicians who committed suicide
Suicides in the Soviet Union
1933 deaths